In computer networking, the Reliable User Datagram Protocol (RUDP) is a transport layer protocol designed at Bell Labs for the Plan 9 operating system. It aims to provide a solution where UDP is too primitive because guaranteed-order packet delivery is desirable, but TCP adds too much complexity/overhead. In order for RUDP to gain higher quality of service, RUDP implements features that are similar to TCP with less overhead.

Implementations
In order to ensure quality, it extends UDP by means of adding the following features:

 Acknowledgment of received packets
 Windowing and flow control
 Retransmission of lost packets
 Over buffering (Faster than real-time streaming)

RUDP is not currently a formal standard, however it was described in an IETF Internet Draft in 1999. It has not been proposed for standardization.

Cisco RUDP
Cisco in its Signalling Link Terminals (either standalone or integrated in another gateway) uses RUDP for backhauling of SS7 MTP3 or ISDN signaling.

 RUDP v0 (no checksums) is used for SS7 MTP3 backhaul.
 RUDP v1 (with checksum) is used for ISDN PRI backhaul.

The versions are mutually incompatible and differ slightly from the IETF draft. The structure of the Cisco Session Manager used on top of RUDP is also different.

Microsoft R-UDP
Microsoft introduced another protocol which it named R-UDP and used it in its MediaRoom product (now owned by Ericsson) for IPTV service delivery over multicast networks.  This is a proprietary protocol and very little is known about its operation.  It is not thought to be based on the above referenced IETF draft.

See also
 Stream Control Transmission Protocol
 Datagram Transport Layer Security

References

External links
 Plan 9 implementation of RUDP
 https://datatracker.ietf.org/doc/html/draft-ietf-sigtran-reliable-udp-00/
 Cisco Signaling Link Terminal

Transport layer protocols
Internet protocols